Girish Kumar Taurani (born 30 January 1989) is an Indian actor working in the Hindi film industry. Kumar made his Bollywood debut with the romantic comedy film Ramaiya Vastavaiya, opposite Shruti Haasan, which was released on 19 July 2013.

Career
An ethnic Sindhi, Kumar was signed for the Bollywood romance film Ramaiya Vastavaiya, directed by Prabhu Deva and produced by his father Kumar S. Taurani, who is the managing director of Tips Industries Limited. In order to build the physique required for the film, Kumar had to undergo a strict regimen of training and diet for three years. He had also learned surfing for the film.

Taran Adarsh of Bollywood Hungama commented on his performance: "Girish being a first-timer, there are some rough edges, but the fact is, he's photogenic and goes through the rigmarole with confidence." Sarit Ray of Hindustan Times gave a less favourable review of his portrayal, saying "His dancing, unfortunately is only slightly less stiff than his acting." The film earned little praise from critics and underperformed at the box office. In 2016, Girish played Gaurav in Loveshhuda, a romantic comedy opposite Navneet Kaur Dhillon. The film received unfavorable reviews from critics and was unsuccessful at the box office. He next starred in Collateral Damage, a short film on an archaic practice that exists in villages. The film was released on 29 November 2018 and was screened at many film festivals.

Filmography

See also
 List of Indian film actors

References

External links
 
 

Male actors in Hindi cinema
Indian male film actors
Sindhi people
Living people
1989 births